The Ribnik is a river in western Bosnia and Herzegovina. It is a headwater tributary of the Sana, which it meat at Strane and Velije hamlets of the Gornji Ribnik village, 17 km below the Sana's own source springs, bringing in a large amounts of water to the still young Sana. It is among shortest of the Sana tributaries but at the same time among largest by the volume it discharges into the receiving Sana. The Ribnik is well known as a prime fly fishing fishery and is popular among anglers throughout the world.


Name
The name of the river derives from the Slavic word for fish, riba, from which derives ribnjak or  ribnik, a fish pond, a river, or a pool, or a body of water stocked with fish.

Geography and hydrology
The Ribnik river, just like the Sana in its upper course, is classified mountain river with upland freshwater ecology, with its very clear and cold waters, classified as the Class I (or A) purity. Gushing out of the karst plateau with Ovčara as most prominent summit (1576 m), between Klekovača and Vitorog mountains. The springs of both the river Sana and the Ribnik are located in a municipality of Ribnik, in Bosnia and Herzegovina, Republika Srpska entity (regionally it is a Western Bosnia and Herzegovina), in a wider areal of the villages of Gornji and Donji Vrbljani.
The Ribnik basin comprise about 447 square kilometres

Springs
The Ribnik emerges near the small hamlet Solići. The spring group consist of three very strong karstic well-springs from which river-sized flow is immediately formed. Upper group consisting of two springs set the small stream and after about a 500 meters merge with a third and strongest well-spring coming from the right, forming the Ribnik main course. 

The sources of the Ribnik River are about 4 km from the village of Ribnik.  The Ribnik River is approximately 8 km long and represents one of the shortest and very rich flows by water, not only in the territory of our Republika Srpska but also in Europe. Its journey ends at the village of Velije where it flows into the River Sanaa. The waters of the Ribnik River belong to the waters of class I.

The Ribnik springs out below the mountain Srnetica, 4 km above the central hamlet of Gornji Ribnik settlement group. The spring group consists of three springs, two of which are permanent and strong, and one more occasional spring. They appearing at the contact of the Cretaceous limestone and the Lower Triassic clastites. Depending on the season, spring group yield oscillations significantly, with an average discharge Qmid measured at 15,5 m3/s (Qmin = 1,25 m3/s; and Qmax above 100 m3/s). It is broken type and ascending outflow mechanism.

Course
It is a short chalk river, with a course only 5.5 kilometres long. The Ribnik falls into a category of a streams, with a clear and cold waters, however its course has relatively small gradient which contributes to a placid flow with mild rapids. of the Sana tributaries but at the same time among largest by water volume it discharge into Sana.
It is a headwaters tributary of the Sana, which it meat at Donji Ribnik, 17 km below Sana own spring, bringing large amounts of waters to young Sana.

Tourism and outdoor recreation

The river Ribnik, together with the Sana, represents an very important tourist potential. Its waters are rich in salamonids fish, greyling and brown trout, which is also evidence of rivers' water quality. The area around the rivers is hilly to mountainous, covered with a lush forests, rich in forest fruits, mushrooms and herbs, with many mountain peaks and lookouts, karstic springs and waterfalls. The preserved natural environment, with unpolluted water and air, offering the opportunity for all kinds of outdoor recreation,  walking, hiking, caving, hunting and fly fishing. Traditional culture and folk customs, with folklore events and original music, are part of the offer. This diversity of tourist resources and rich cultural heritage make area around the river popular destination.

Fly fishing

The Ribnik municipality is known for hunting and fishing, and the fly fishing competitions are held on the River seasonally. The Ribnik is famous and popular throughout the world among fly fishing aficionados as Bosnia's and Europe's prime fly fishing destination, with an abundant brown trout stock, and especially for its trophy sized greyling population.

Hunting
Hills and mountains in the wider area of the Ribnik are well maintained hunting grounds, with a game feeding grounds. Hunting trails with open and closed type checks, as well as hunting lodges are available. These hunting areas represent a nature reserve used for breeding of wide variety of game, such as bears, wild boars, wolves, foxes, lynx, as well as very rare species of deer and grouse. The Ribnik hunting and game feeding and breeding grounds complex are among best in the Balkans.

Hiking and caving

Šiša is one of the mountains in this region, adorned with a dense coniferous and deciduous forests, as well as numerous glades with lush meadows. Šiški Kamen (also known as Sokolovača) is a tall limestone cliff, located at the very top of this mountain. At the bottom of the cliff is a small cave. It is one of mountain's prime attractions. 

The Ledena pećina is located near the village of Vučija Poljana (lit.), at an altitude of over 1200 m a.s.l., and is surrounded by lush coniferous forests. The cave has not yet been sufficiently explored. Nevertheless, it represents an interesting speleological phenomenon, with  the large amounts of precipitation in the are is being collected in the cave and during the winter months turned into huge blocks of ice due to extreme low temperatures. This phenomenon is the reason behind the cave's name. The amounts of ice and snow collected in the interior of the cave is easily maintained during the summer months by cave's low inner temperature and location high altitude.

Ambiance and leisure
Ambiental value of a spring areal is important for local tourism too, and have a higher management value than hydromorphological one (although water quality makes it potable). Nearby arranged picnic areas exist with an open access, as well as the proximity to larger settlement Gornji Ribnik, where the newly built accommodation facilities is on offer, along with other natural and cultural values. The attractive nature and accessible river banks abound in preserved flora and fauna.
The close-by springs of the Sana river with three extremely strong individual karstic springs from which full-size river flow is formed, is located in the vicinity to the village of Donji Vrbljani, and complements whole area's ambiental value and touristic potential. The river Sana is also rich in salmonids.

See also
Neretva

References

Tourism in Bosnia and Herzegovina
Ribnik, Bosnia and Herzegovina
Rivers of Bosnia and Herzegovina
Recreational fishing in Bosnia and Herzegovina

External links
Bosnia Blue-winged Olive, by Alex Jardine (aardvarkmcleod.com)
Bosnia, at Fishmaster